Monkleigh is a village, parish and former manor in north Devon, England, situated 2 1/2 miles north-west of Great Torrington and 3 1/2 miles south-east of Bideford. An electoral ward exists titled Monkleigh and Littleham. The population at the 2011 census was 1,488.

Etymology
The name of the village, Monkleigh, originates from the Old English "Munckenelegh", used in 1244 to describe a "wood or clearing of the monks", referring to a 12th-century property owned by the Montacute Priory. The area was previously named "Lega" in the Domesday Book of 1086.

Description
In 1887, John Bartholomew, Gazetteer of the British Isles, described Monkleigh as a village and a parish. It had a population of 540 people, covered 2177 acres, and had property that belonged to the Montacute monastery. It includes the hamlets of Saltern Cottages (also known as Annery Cottages) and Annery kilns, both of which are historic listed sites. Located west of the River Torridge valley, the village sits on high ground with scenic views of the parish. It was originally part of the Shebbear Hundred and is within the Church of England's Deanery of Hartland.

History

Monastery
William, Count of Mortain, the founder of the Montacute Priory, gave the Monkleigh manor to the priory during the reign of Henry I (1100–1135). It was owned by the Montacute Priory in Somerset until the Dissolution of the Monasteries (between 1536 and 1541).

Monkleigh manor

When the monasteries were dissolved, the manor was granted by the crown gratis on 26 August 1540 to James and Anne Coffyn (also Coffin) of Alwington for the term of her life. Anne was the widow of Sir George St Ledger of Annery. In June 1544, the crown granted the manor of Monkleigh to Sir John Fulford of Dunsford and Humphrey Colles of Barton, Somerset, who paid the purchase price for the manor and obtained royal licence to alienate to James Coffyn. In other words, the manor was purchased for the Coffyns.

In 1810 the manor of Monkleigh was owned by Rev. John Pine-Coffin of Portledge, Alwington, from the same family as James Coffyn. About 1823 Richard Pine-Coffin sold Monkleigh manor land to John Rolle, 1st Baron Rolle for the development of the Rolle Canal.

Annery, historic estate

The former historic estate of Annery was a neo-Classical mansion house that stood in a "fine timbered park" dating back to the 13th century or before. An early owner was Osbert of Annery. By 1260 the house was owned by the Stapeldons; Walter de Stapeldon was born in the Annery that year and later became the Bishop of Exeter from 1307 to 1326 and Edward II's Lord High Treasurer. After the Stapeldons, it was owned by Sir William Hankford. The Annery fell into decay and in 1800 a new building was built on the grounds of the medieval building. It was demolished in 1957.

The ruins of the lime Annery kiln, built about 1823–1824 for Lord Rolle, are located along the River Torridge. Limestone was brought from Caldy Island and Gower Peninsula.

Church of St George

In the early 15th century parish church is dedicated to St George. Sir William Hankford, Chief Justice of the King's Bench, left monies for the church to complete construction of the south aisle in his will. He stipulated that the south aisle should be reserved for his and his heirs burial. Hankford died in 1423; at that time the fabric was being rebuilt. Hankford was buried in a canopied alter-tomb.

The Annery aisle has bench-ends decorated with the arms of the Annery manor families and emblems of the Passion. Tiles from the late medieval period are found in the aisle and the nave. A kneeling effigy of James Coffin, Esquire (1566) in armour sat on a high tomb and was since destroyed. Pevsner stated that a small monumental brass of a kneeling knight, affixed to a stone tablet, and with heraldic escutcheons of the arms of Coffin, is dated from the 16th century. Sir James St. Leger (1509) is represented in brass.

From 1862 to 1863 the church was restored. According to Pevsner, it contains one of the most remarkable medieval wooden screens in Devon; It is a detailed parclose screen that may date to 1537 when Dame Anne St. Leger founded a chantry in the chapel.

Other historic buildings
Some of the other historic buildings in Monkleigh include the early 19th century Monkleigh Millhouse; an early 19th-century country house, Petticombe Manor; Rudha Bridge Millhouse; The Bell Inn, originally built in the 17th century; and farmhouses, cottages, outbuildings, and bridges.

Transportation

Roads
Monkleigh is served by A388 road.

Ferry
The same ship, the MS Oldenburg, also provides evening cruises from Bideford along the River Torridge.

Bus
There are several bus services provided by Stagecoach Devon, Carmel Coaches and Jackett bus services as of May 2013, including:
 85   – Bude to Barnstaple
 85   – Holsworthy to Barnstaple     
 85C  – St Giles on the Heath to Sticklepath (Barnstaple Petroc North Devon College)   
 646  – Halwill Junction to Barnstaple   
 X85  – Barnstaple to Plymouth

Railway
The nearest railway stations are at Umberleigh, Chapelton and Barnstaple.

Airports
The nearest airports for public transportation are Eaglescott Airfield and Exeter International Airport.

Education
Monkleigh Primary School conducts 3 mixed age classes within the town of Monkleigh.

Other nearby schools are Langtree Community School And Nursery Unit, East-The-Water Community Primary School, Buckland Brewer Community Primary School, Pynes Infant School And Nursery and West Croft Junior School.

Notable people
 William Hankford, Chief Justice of the King's Bench
 John St. Leger, Member of Parliament
 Walter de Stapeldon, Bishop of Exeter and Edward II's Lord High Treasurer

Notes

Sources

References

External links

Villages in Devon
Torridge District